Aleš Kokot (born 23 October 1979) is a Slovenian football player, who plays for Kecskeméti TE.

Club career
Born in Šempeter pri Gorici in western Slovenia, Kokot spent his childhood in the nearby town of Nova Gorica. He started his career at his home club Gorica. There he played eight seasons, winning Prva liga and Slovenian Cup two times before moving to German side SpVgg Greuther Fürth in 2005. Two years later he joined SV Wehen. After another two seasons in Second German league he joined Interblock Ljubljana on 23 June 2009. He was released by Interblock on 24 October 2009 and signed in February 2010 for Kecskeméti TE in Hungary.

Honours

Gorica
Slovenian Championship: 2003–04, 2004–05
Slovenian Cup: 2000–01, 2001–02

See also
Slovenian international players

References

External links
Player profile at NZS 

1979 births
Living people
People from Nova Gorica
Slovenian footballers
Association football defenders
ND Gorica players
Slovenian expatriate footballers
Slovenian expatriate sportspeople in Germany
2. Bundesliga players
Expatriate footballers in Germany
SpVgg Greuther Fürth players
SV Wehen Wiesbaden players
NK IB 1975 Ljubljana players
Expatriate footballers in Hungary
Slovenian expatriate sportspeople in Hungary
Kecskeméti TE players
Slovenia under-21 international footballers
Slovenia international footballers
Slovenia youth international footballers